The Police Band of the Abu Dhabi Police General Headquarters also known internationally as the Abu Dhabi Police Brass Band (Arabic: فرقة شرطة براس أبوظبي) is the official musical unit of the Abu Dhabi Police in the United Arab Emirates (UAE). It also serves as a military band of the UAE Armed Forces. The band currently serves with the deep emphasis in the importance of motivating police officers and the public, with some of its pieces encompassing marching, traditional, Arab, and British genres. In 1963, Brigadier General Ishaq Suleiman, a sergeant in a Jordanian Army Band, while on tour in London met with the niece of an official aide to the Shakhbut bin Sultan Al Nahyan, who wished to create a police band the city. She then invited Suleiman to the UAE to lead the band, giving him a ticket to Abu Dhabi so he could have the opportunity to consult with the Emir. He began recruiting members for the band from foreign countries such as Pakistan due to the common sentiment at the time by Emiratis about playing music, of which they considered shameful. He eventually created a 60-member band, made up of 30 bagpipes and 30 brass instruments. The band originally performed military marches, but time went by, Suleiman started teaching them famous symphonies by Beethoven, Tchaikovsky, Mozart. Suleiman, who left the band in 1980 and retired in 1991, designed the current ranking insignia worn band, as well as the police department. The 173-member band, who has received its training and experience from the Abu Dhabi Police College since 2004, has performed at venues all over the world, including at the coronation of Sayyid
Qaboos bin Said al Said in 1970, the Spasskaya Tower Military Music Festival and Tattoo in 2013, and the Berlin Military Music Festival in 2014.

See also
 Music of the United Arab Emirates
 United Arab Emirates Armed Forces Band

Videos
 "Спасская башня - 2013". Оркестр полиции Абу-Даби
 The Abu Dhabi Police Band in 2015

References

Organisations based in Abu Dhabi
Musical groups established in 1963
Police bands
1963 establishments in the Trucial States